Herbert Vanallen Clark (March 16, 1919 – January 25, 2003) was a U.S. Army Air Force/U.S. Air Force officer, and combat fighter pilot with the all-African American 332nd Fighter Group, best known as the Tuskegee Airmen. He completed two tours of duty, completing ten missions on his second tour. In 1944, Clark's aircraft was shot down over Italy, and was reported as missing in action. He was picked up by the Italian resistance, evading enemies for eight months before rejoining his unit. He retired with a rank of major.

Early life, family
Clark was born on March 16, 1919, in Pine Bluff, Arkansas, Jefferson County, Arkansas. His mother was a high school mathematics teacher and his father, Jeremiah Clark, was the pastor of the St. Paul's Baptist Church.

Military career
In 1942, he signed up for the U.S. government's Civilian Pilot Training Program (CPTP). After completing the CPTP, he entered basic training. Clark attended the Tuskegee Cadet Pilot program, graduating from its Single Engine Section Class SE-42-F on 3 July 1942 and receiving his wings and commission as a 2nd Lieutenant. He was then assigned to the 332rd Fighter Group's 99th Pursuit Squadron. He participated in several missions around Sicily, including Pantelleria and Sciacca. By 5 November 1943, he completed his first combat tour and returned to the United States. Along with other veterans of the 99th Squadron, he declined to return with the 332nd when it left for Italy on December 24, 1943; fellow veteran Charles W. Dryden attributed this to low morale in his memoir. Clark was stationed at Selfridge, Michigan where he became a flight instructor for the 553d Fighter-Bomber Squadron.

Clark began a second combat tour in Europe, during which he completed ten missions. He was seen parachuting from his burning aircraft, and was listed as missing in action. He suffered a head wound when he struck a tree parachuting to the ground, and was immediately picked up by the Italian resistance who sheltered him for eight months. During his time with the resistance, Clark led a group of partisans attacking German positions in northern Italy. On 4 May 1945 he returned to Allied lines.According to the Fifteenth Army Air Force, "nothing short of pandemonium would describe the reactions ... when everyone realized that the group's own 'Bud Clark' had actually returned".

Clark retired with the rank of major.

Awards
Congressional Gold Medal awarded to the Tuskegee Airmen in 2006

Death and influence
Clark died on January 25, 2003, at the age of 83. He was interred at the Westview Cemetery in Blacksburg, Virginia, Montgomery County, Virginia. The Fifteenth Army Air Force reported that Clark had innovated as a pilot by landing his P-40 Warhawk on one wheel while returning from a dive bombing mission over the Anzio Beachhead. Dr. Henry Foster knew Clark as a child and was influenced by his war stories, pursuing work at an air force base and learning to fly. When he realized that none of the Tuskegee Airmen could find work with the U.S. airlines due to their practice of hiring only white pilots, Foster abandoned his goal of studying aeronautical engineering and decided to focus on medicine, later serving as a doctor at the Tuskegee Institute for eight years.

See also 

 Executive Order 9981
 List of Tuskegee Airmen
 List of Tuskegee Airmen Cadet Pilot Graduation Classes
 Military history of African Americans
 Fly (play) (2009 play about the 332d Fighter Group)

References

External links
Major Herbert Vanallen Clark at Find a Grave
Major Herbert Vanallen Clark at Geni
 Tuskegee Airmen at Tuskegee University
 Tuskegee Airmen, Inc.
 Tuskegee Airmen National Historic Site (U.S. National Park Service) 
 Tuskegee Airmen National Museum

Tuskegee Airmen
United States Army Air Forces officers
Military personnel from Tuskegee, Alabama
African-American aviators
Military personnel from Arkansas
Military personnel from Virginia
1919 births
2003 deaths
21st-century African-American people